Paul Hardwick (15 November 1918 in Bridlington, East Riding of Yorkshire – 22 October 1983, London) was an English actor.

Career

Theatre
The Wars of the Roses (1965) – Gloucester

Filmography

Television

References

External links

 
 Paul Hardwick Obituary  in The New York Times

1918 births
1983 deaths
People from Bridlington
English male stage actors
English male film actors
English male television actors
20th-century English male actors